Sarnia Beach is a hamlet within the Rural Municipality of Sarnia No. 221 in the province of Saskatchewan, Canada.

Demographics 

References

Designated places in Saskatchewan
Organized hamlets in Saskatchewan
Sarnia No. 221, Saskatchewan
Division No. 6, Saskatchewan